Olmstead is a historic railroad station in Olmsted, Illinois. The station was built in 1872 by the Cairo and Vincennes Railroad. The railroad provided passenger and freight service to the town. Freight trains imported merchandise for the town's shops and exported goods such as chickens, mussel shells, and agricultural products. The passengers brought in by the trains also improved the town's economy by increasing sales for its businesses. The Cleveland, Cincinnati, Chicago and St. Louis Railway operated the station after it acquired the Cairo and Vincennes Railroad. Service to the station ended in 1955.

The station was listed on the National Register of Historic Places on December 15, 1989, as the Olmstead Depot.

Notes

Railway stations on the National Register of Historic Places in Illinois
National Register of Historic Places in Pulaski County, Illinois
Former railway stations in Illinois
Former New York Central Railroad stations
Buildings and structures in Pulaski County, Illinois